Leasingham is a village and civil parish in the North Kesteven district of Lincolnshire, England. The hamlet of Roxholm lies to the north. When combined with Rauceby figures, there are a total of 916 households as of 2011. The population of the civil parish at the 2011 census was 1,584.

The B1209 passes through the village to join the A153 further east, passing across Leasingham Moor. Close by to the west is RAF Cranwell. The A15 used to run through the village on Captain's Hill until the 1950s.

Captain's Hill takes its name from the local landowner, Captain Richard Wharton-Myddleton, who had been an ensign at the battle of Waterloo. He lived in Leasingham Hall (built about 1836) now a Grade II listed house. On 4 January 2022, this hall had a renovation to transform it into 6 flats, however work could not begin initially due to safety concerns over tree preservation.

Other buildings in the village include the church of St Andrews, a Wesleyan chapel, manor house, village hall and a row of alms houses. The local school is St Andrew's C.E. Primary School, which partners with Carre's Grammar School using its Outreach programme. The playing fields include a bowls club and cricket pitch.

Amenities include the Duke of Wellington public house, Busy Bees Preschool, a post office shop, corner shop, farm shop, and two hairdressers.
 
A local bus service runs every hour to Sleaford, with links to Lincoln, Grantham, Nottingham and Skegness.

Scout Group 

The local scout group is 1st Leasingham Scouts and is held in St Andrew's Primary School's main hall. The group is run by a selection of leaders and young leaders, split into beavers, cubs and scouts. The necker colours are red and blue.

The group takes part in remembrance service in Leasingham and St George's Day parades in Sleaford. The beavers on 17 April 2016 were invited round Sleaford Tesco Superstore to learn how their food is prepared as part of their farm2fork programme. And as part of Poacher 2022, both the beavers and cubs were invited to take part in Junior Poacher 2022 which involved a more limited version of the main event but still including activities like water zorbs and climbing walls. Whereas the scouts section took part in the whole event.

References

External links

St Andrews C.E. Primary School Website
Leasingham War Memorial
1st Leasingham Scout Group Twitter

Villages in Lincolnshire
Civil parishes in Lincolnshire
North Kesteven District